Bocatherium is an extinct genus of tritylodonts from the Pliensbachian (Early Jurassic) of Tamaulipas, Mexico. It is known only from a skull found at the Huizachal Canyon locality, "a Pliensbachian floodplain siltstone in the La Boca Formation".

References

Jurassic synapsids
Prehistoric cynodont genera
Fossils of Mexico
Tritylodontids
Fossil taxa described in 1985